David Warren Maurer (April 12, 1906 – June 11, 1981) was a professor of linguistics at the University of Louisville from 1937 to 1972. He was the writer of numerous studies of the language of the American underworld.

Biography
Maurer received a doctorate from the Ohio State University in Comparative Literature in 1935. He spent much of his academic career studying the language of criminals, drug addicts, and other marginal subcultures.

In 1974 he filed a $10 million lawsuit charging that the movie The Sting and the book of the same name had been copied from his book The Big Con. The lawsuit was settled out of court in 1976.

He died on his farm outside Louisville from a self-inflicted gunshot wound.

Works
The Big Con is Maurer's most popular and perhaps most important book. It was published in 1940 by Bobbs-Merrill Company. The source material for it came from Maurer's correspondence, interviews, and informal chats with hundreds of underworld denizens during the 1930s. Among the interviewed criminals were such figures as Joseph "The Yellow Kid" Weil, Charles Gondorff and Limehouse Chappie. Maurer won the trust of hundreds of grifters, who let him in on their language and their methods. The book served as a source for the film The Sting as well as the episode "Horseplay" from The Adventures of Harry Lime.

Maurer wrote three other books: Narcotics and Narcotic Addiction, Whiz Mob: A Correlation of the Technical Argot of Pickpockets with Their Behavior Pattern, and Kentucky Moonshine. In all these books, Maurer described the language, mostly the lexicon, of the people living in these "subcultures". For example, in the last book, he focused on the craft of the moonshiners, discussed their infiltration of "dry" counties and reported their terminology. Language of the Underworld is a collection of several of his previous published articles collected by two of his students. It includes an introduction that describes the methods he used to collect criminal argot.

Maurer also wrote The American Confidence Man.

References

Further reading

External links
David Maurer, the Dean of Criminal Language

1906 births
1981 deaths
Linguists from the United States
Ohio State University Graduate School alumni
University of Louisville faculty
Suicides by firearm in Kentucky
20th-century linguists
1981 suicides